Miss República Dominicana 1997 was held on December 10, 1996. There were 24 candidates, representing provinces and municipalities, who entered. The winner would represent the Dominican Republic at Miss Universe 1997. The first runner up would enter Miss World 1997. The second runner up would enter in Miss International 1997. The rest of finalist entered different pageants.

Results

Delegates

Miss Dominican Republic
1997 beauty pageants
1997 in the Dominican Republic